The Aotearoa Music People's Choice Award is an Aotearoa Music Award that honours New Zealand music artists, as chosen by public vote. The five finalists are determined by the Music Awards Committee, based on overall performance during the eligibility period. It is the only New Zealand Music Award decided by public vote.

In 2008, the award attracted controversy, after unknown Dunedin pop-rock band The DFender made the nominations shortlist. The band, who did not have any chart material, had extensively lobbied their fans on MySpace and gained the most votes in the initial nominations round. This prompted the call for the nominations to be chosen by Recorded Music NZ, a change that was eventually made.

The People's Choice Award was first awarded in 2004 to Scribe. Fat Freddy's Drop has won the award twice and been nominated two further times, while Stan Walker has won the award twice, with Walker having been nominated every year from 2010 to 2015. Lorde and Brooke Fraser have each won the award and been nominated a further two times.

Recipients

References

People's Choice Award
Awards established in 2004